Poullignac is a commune in the Charente department in southwestern France.

Population

Sights
The Romanesque Church of Saint-Martin, built from the end of the 11th century to the beginning of the 12th, was classified as a historic monument in 1987. The apse was replaced in the 12th century with the current barrel vault choir. The brick vault in the nave dates from 1844. There are murals painted in the choir, and traces of paintings in the rest of the church.

See also
Communes of the Charente department

References

Communes of Charente
Charente communes articles needing translation from French Wikipedia